Podistera is a genus of flowering plants in the carrot family. The four species are native to western North America, where they grow in high mountains and northern latitudes. They are compact, mat-forming perennial herbs with a low, clumpy habit common among plants growing in harsh, exposed, cold, dry habitat.

Species:
Podistera eastwoodiae - Eastwood's podistera (Colorado, Utah, New Mexico)
Podistera macounii - Macoun's woodroot (Alaska, Yukon, Northwest Territories)
Podistera nevadensis - Sierra podistera (California)
Podistera yukonensis - Yukon podistera (Alaska, Yukon)

References

External links 
 Jepson Manual Treatment
 USDA Plants Profile

Apioideae
Apioideae genera